The Two-man competition at the 2017 World Championships was held on 18 and 19 February 2017.

Results
The first two runs were held on 18 and the two last runs on 19 February 2017.

References

Two-man